Aisha Wahab (born 1987/1988) is an American politician who has served as a member of the California State Senate from the 10th district since 2022. A member of the Democratic Party, Wahab served on the Hayward City Council from 2018 to 2022 and was one of the first Afghan-Americans elected public office, alongside New Hampshire state representative Safiya Wazir.

Early life and education 
Wahab was born in Queens, New York City, to refugees who fled Afghanistan in the 1980s. Her father was murdered and her mother died soon after, leaving Wahab and her sister in foster care. They were adopted by an Afghan couple in Fremont, California, and moved to Hayward after the 2008 Financial Crisis

Wahab earned a Bachelor's degree in political science at San Jose State University and a Masters in Business Administration from Cal State East Bay. She went on to work in non-profit organizations and is currently an IT consultant.

Career

Hayward City Council
Wahab was the top vote-getter in a field of seven candidates vying for an at-large city council seat, beating out two incumbents. Along with New Hampshire State Representative Safiya Wazir, Wahab was the first Afghan-American elected to public office.

Tenure
California State Assembly member Bill Quirk recognized Wahab as Woman of the Year from District 20 in 2019.

2020 Congressional campaign

After incumbent U.S. Representative Eric Swalwell announced he would run in the 2020 Democratic Party presidential primaries, Wahab announced she would run for California's 15th congressional district in 2020. Her support for progressive policies such as Medicare for All and identity as a millennial women of color led to comparisons to freshman representative Alexandria Ocasio-Cortez. Swalwell decided to run for re-election after ending his presidential campaign, leading Wahab to suspend her campaign 3 weeks later.

2022 California State Senate campaign

Wahab announced she would run for California's 10th State Senate district, incumbent State Senator Bob Wieckowski was term-limited. She noted the housing crisis and stagnating wages as issues she would focus on. California State Assembly member Alex Lee and former Chair of the Federal Election Commission Ann Ravel backed her campaign. She won in the general election on November 8, 2022.

References

Democratic Party California state senators
21st-century American women politicians
American people of Afghan descent
People from Hayward, California
San Jose State University alumni
California State University, East Bay alumni
1980s births
Living people